Veszprém is one of the oldest urban areas in Hungary, and a city with county rights. It is the administrative center of the county of the same name.

Etymology
The name of the city originates from a Slavic personal name Bezprem or Bezprym (Proto-Slavic  Bezprěmъ) meaning "stubborn", "self-confident, not willing to retreat". Besprem (before 1002), Vezprem (1086), Bezpremensis (1109). The form Vezprem originates in early medieval scribal habits and frequent exchange of B and V under the influence of Greek.

The city was named either after a chieftain, or the son of Judith of Hungary, who settled here after her husband Boleslaus I of Poland expelled her and her son.

Location and legend 
The city can be reached via the M7 highway and Road 8. It can also be reached from Győr via Road 82 and from Székesfehérvár via Road 8.

According to legend, Veszprém was founded on seven hills. The seven hills are Várhegy (Castle Hill), Benedek-hegy (St. Benedict Hill), Jeruzsálem-hegy (Jerusalem Hill), Temetőhegy (Cemetery Hill), Gulyadomb (Herd Hill), Kálvária-domb (Calvary Hill), and Cserhát.

History

Anonymus Belæ Regis Notarius (the anonymous notary of King Béla III) wrote that a castle already stood here when the Hungarians first occupied the area. The castle was probably a 9th-century Frankish fortress. The castles of Veszprém, Esztergom and Székesfehérvár, were the earliest Hungarian stone castles, which had already been built during the reign of High Prince Géza, a time when motte castles were much more common.

Veszprém had an important religious role during the struggle to make Christianity the official religion of Hungary - Stephen I of Hungary defeated the armies of his chief opponent, Koppány, near Veszprém. The city became the first episcopal seat of Hungary in 1009 and an archiepiscopal seat in 1993. Comitatus Veszprém was one of the earliest historical counties of Hungary.

Veszprém was the favorite city of Queen Gisela, the wife of St. Stephen. For centuries, the queens of Hungary were crowned by the bishop of Veszprém. The city is still often called "the city of queens". In the year 1294 Queen Fenenna confirmed that, at that time, the former Queen Elizabeth had the privilege to collect the donations of the church in the Veszprém County.

Veszprém was among the first Hungarian cities to have a university - students studied law and arts here for several centuries. The university was destroyed by fire in 1276, when Peter I Csák invaded and devastated the Diocese of Veszprém. Veszprém became a university town again in the 20th century.

Veszprém changed hands between Austrians and Ottomans until 1684 after the Battle of Mohács in 1526. It was known as 'Pespirim' and was a sanjak centre in Budin Province during Ottoman rule.

The town was plundered by the Turks in 1552, but they could not maintain occupation: the region north of Lake Balaton remained in the Kingdom of Hungary (1538–1867) (captaincy between Balaton and Drava). The castle was demolished in 1706. Until 1918, VESZPRIM (also named WESZPRIM and WESPRIM near 1850, and WEISSBRUNN in German) was part of the Austrian monarchy/Austria-Hungary, Kingdom of Hungary; in Transleithania after the compromise of 1867 in the  Kingdom of Hungary.

During World War II, Veszprém was captured by Soviet troops of the 3rd Ukrainian Front on 23 March 1945 in the course of the Vienna Offensive.

Economy
The Hungarian automotive plastic spare parts manufacturer Videoton Plastic (part of Videoton), the Hungarian kiosk manufacturer Kiosksystems, the Hungarian shutter manufacturer Roll-Lux, the Hungarian label manufacturer Imprenta, the Hungarian tool manufacturer Solidsteel, the Hungarian technical ceramics manufacturer Bakony Ipari Kerámia, the Hungarian furniture manufacturer Balaton Bútor, the Hungarian machine manufacturer Flexmont, the Hungarian watermanagement company PureAqua, the Hungarian automotive spare parts manufacturer Win-Pres, the Hungarian construction company VEMÉVSZER, the Hungarian metal manufacturer Ferro-Trio, the Hungarian OOK Printhouse, the Hungarian toolmanufacturer Plasticor, the Hungarian machine manufacturer Transmoduls, the Hungarian Prospektus Printhouse have both their headquarters and main production facilities in Veszprém.

The French pharmaceutical company Citoxlab, the Austrian plaster manufacturer Lasselsberger-Knauf, the Swiss electric motor manufacturer Maxon Motor, the Austrian tile manufacturer Bramac, the French automotive spare parts manufacturer Valeo, the German electromagnetical controlsystems manufacturer nass magnet, the German automotive spare parts manufacturer Continental AG, the German automotive spare parts manufacturer Thun, the German sensor manufacturer Pepperl+Fuchs, the Austrian chimney and ventilation system manufacturer Schiedel, the American power supply security company CoreComm, the German sensor manufacturer Balluff, the German automotive spare parts manufacturer Jost, the German health devices manufacturer Beurer, the British-Dutch food producer Unilever and the Hungarian dairy product manufacturer Pannontej operate production plants in the city.

The Dutch General Logistics Systems, the Hungarian Magyar Posta, the German Penny Market, the Hungarian Locargo and the Austrian Persped have logistics centres there.

The Hungarian owned Vöröskő electrical retailer (holder of the brand Euronics in Hungary) is also based in the city.

The Veszprém Aréna provides place besides sport events for exhibitions and conferences.

Demographics
According to the 2011 census beside the 83.9% Hungarian majority the city has a historical German minority numbering 2.4% of the population. The second largest ethnic group is the Roma with 0.7%. The others are all marginal.

The religious affiliation of the citizens has a Catholic majority with 38.9% Roman Catholic and 0.3% Greek Catholic. The Calvinists (7.0%) have the second, the Lutherans (2.1%) the third largest denomination in the city. 20.6% are not religious.

Politics 
The current mayor of Veszprém is Gyula Porga (Fidesz-KDNP).

The local Municipal Assembly, elected at the 2019 local government elections, is made up of 18 members (1 Mayor, 12 Individual constituencies MEPs and 5 Compensation List MEPs) divided into this political parties and alliances:

Public transport 

The city's public transportation consists exclusively of buses, which are run by the city-funded company V-Busz. 30 bus lines run throughout the city, including lines 44 and 45 which are night buses. All buses are easily recognizable even from a distance due to their purple livery. Tickets can be purchased on the buses, from ticket machines across the city and at bus stations from the ticket desks. V-Busz took over the city's public transportation in 2018 from the regional, state-funded bus company (ÉNYKK) due to a lack of funding and an old rolling stock of buses, some of which were from the mid 80s.

Notable people

Péter Andorka (born in 1984), footballer
Leopold Auer (1845–1930), violinist, academic, conductor and composer
Marian Cozma (1982–2009), handball player
Tamás Kádár (born 1990), footballer
Attila Mesterházy (born 1974), politician (MSZP)
Tibor Navracsics (born 1966), politician, European Commissioner for Education, Culture, Multilingualism and Youth (2014–present)
Leopold Óváry (1833–1919), historian and archivist
Csaba Vastag (born 1982), singer
Tamás Vastag (born 1991), singer
Ádám Lang (born 1993), footballer

Twin towns – sister cities

Veszprém is twinned with:

 Bottrop, Germany
 Debeljača, Serbia
 Gladsaxe, Denmark
 Most, Czech Republic
 Nitra, Slovakia
 Ottignies-Louvain-la-Neuve, Belgium
 Passau, Germany
 Rovaniemi, Finland
 Senftenberg, Germany
 Sfântu Gheorghe, Romania
 Tartu, Estonia
 Tirat Carmel, Israel
 Žamberk, Czech Republic

Tourism 
 Kittenberger Kálmán Zoo & Botanical Garden

Gallery

References 

Notes

External links

 Official site
 English pages on official site
 Pannon University (formerly University of Veszprém)
 Aerial photography: Veszprém
 What to do in Veszprém – Much more than handball
 Veszprém at funiq.hu

 
Populated places in Veszprém County
County seats in Hungary
Cities with county rights of Hungary
Hungarian German communities
Populated places established in the 9th century